Azat Or (Ազատ Օր in Armenian) is an Armenian language daily newspaper published in Athens, Greece. It is an organ of the Armenian Revolutionary Federation.

References

Daily newspapers published in Greece
Armenian-language newspapers
Newspapers published in Athens